There are many breeds of guinea pig or cavy which have been developed since its domestication circa 5000 BCE. Breeds vary widely in appearance and purpose, ranging from show breeds with long, flowing hair to laboratory breeds being used as model organisms for science. From roughly 1200 to 1532 CE (during the Spanish conquest of the Inca Empire), selective breeding by indigenous South American people resulted in many landrace varieties of domestic guinea pigs, which form the basis for some formal modern breeds. Early Andean varieties were primarily kept as agricultural stock for food, and efforts at improving cavy breeds (cuy) bred for food continue to the modern era, with entirely separate breeds that focus on size and disease resistance.

With the export of guinea pigs to Europe in the 15th century, the goal in breeding shifted to focus on the development of appealing pets. To this end, various competitive breeding organizations were founded by fanciers. The American Cavy Breeders Association, an adjunct to the American Rabbit Breeders Association, is the governing body in the United States and Canada. The British Cavy Council governs cavy clubs in the United Kingdom. For Australia and New Zealand, there are the Australian National Cavy Council and the New Zealand Cavy Council. Each club publishes its own "standard of perfection" and determines which breeds are eligible for showing. New breeds are continuously emerging, which may or may not be recognized by these breeding organizations.

Though there are many breeds of guinea pig, only a few found on the show table are common as pets. Most pet guinea pigs were either found undesirable by breeders, or else were bred to be pleasant pets regardless of how well they met the "standard of perfection" for the breed. The American (short-haired), the Abyssinian (rough-coated), the Peruvian (long-coated), and the Sheltie/Silkie (also long-coated) are the breeds most frequently seen as pets. Besides the Silkie, they also historically form the core breeds in the competitive showing of guinea pigs. In addition to their standard form, nearly all breeds come in a satin variant. Satins, due to their hollow hair shafts, possess coats of a special gloss and shine. However, there is growing evidence that the genes responsible for the satin coat can also cause severe bone problems, including osteodystrophy and Paget's disease. For this reason, some cavy breeders' associations, namely the Nordic ones, prohibit showing satin variations because of animal welfare concerns.

All cavy breeds have some shared general standards: the head profile should be rounded and have large eyes and large, smooth ears; the body should be strong and of compact build; coat color should, in all variations, be clearly defined and thorough from root to tip. These standards are best met by long-established, commonly bred breeds, as their breeders have had enough time and animals to effectively breed for these qualities. The coat color ideal—good definition and thoroughness—is rarely met by breeds other than the smooth-coated ones, which have had well-established, separate breeding lines for different colors.

Note on satin variants

A satin guinea pig is not a separate breed, but it has, as its name suggests, a characteristic satin-like, almost glassy, sheen to its coat. The hair shaft on a "true satin" cavy is actually hollow. The genetic factor for having a satin coat is recessive and found in all types of coat: long, rough, curly, and short. There is a Satin version of the following breeds: Abyssinian, American, Peruvian, Silkie, and Teddy.

A satin coat is linked to osteodystrophy (OD), an incurable and potentially painful metabolic disease of the bones. Osteodystrophy symptoms begin showing at around 12 to 18 months of age. These symptoms include wobbly gait, problems with eating, and—with sows—parturition complications. Due to animal welfare concerns, some registries such as the Swedish and Finnish guinea pig associations, refuse to register satin cavies or even cavies with a satin parent.

American

The most common guinea pig breed, the American guinea pig, is a recognized breed by the American Rabbit Breeders Association (ARBA). They are entered and shown in ARBA competitions in nineteen color classifications; Black, Cream, Red, White, Any Other Self (Beige, Chocolate, Lilac, Red-Eyed Orange), Brindle, Roan, Dilute Solid, Golden Solid, Silver Solid, Dilute Agouti, Golden Agouti, Silver Agouti, Dalmatian, Dutch, Himalayan, Tortoise Shell & White, Any Other Marked (Broken Color and Tortoise Shell), and Tan Pattern (Black Tan, Blue Tan, Chocolate Tan, Beige Tan, and Lilac Tan). The American guinea pig is to be posed with the hind feet under the animal and the front feet slightly ahead of the shoulders, and should not be forced into a cobby position or stretched out.

The American should have a broad shoulder, Roman nose, and full crown, and the coat is to be short and silky. The coat is faulted for feathering, harshness, or be thin or long. Contestants are disqualified for ridges, rosettes, side whiskers, or a Satin sheen, though this should not be confused with the natural luster of some varieties. The ears are to be drooping but not fallen, and the eyes are to be bold and bright.

The American is known for its sweet and docile personality, and is considered by many an excellent breed of cavy for new owners.

White Crested
The White Crested is similar to the American, but they have one white rosette on the forehead. The breed standards and ideals are nearly identical, with the exception that a White Crested cavy's crest should be completely of a color different from the rest of the animal. Most usually the crest is white, as necessitated by the ACBA standard. No other white hair should be present in the animal. By this standard, White Cresteds are not bred in colorations that have white anywhere on the body, such as Dutch, roan, and Dalmatian.

Abyssinian

The derivation of the breed's name is unknown, but does not connote an origin in the geographical region of Abyssinia (present day Ethiopia).

The Abyssinian breed is known for their 'rosettes', which are cowlicks growing from the coat. 

Between the rosettes of the Abyssinian's hair are the ridges, worth 25 points by ARBA standard. The ridges between two rosettes should ideally stand rigidly straight, without breaking down onto either side even if pressed down lightly with the palm of a hand. There should be a collar ridge, back ridge, rump ridge, and ridges between every saddle, hip, and rump rosette. ARBA faults for flatness of coat, crooked ridges, a short coat, and soft texture. Other hair disqualifications include a coat over 1.5 inches in length and a satin sheen (not to be confused by the natural luster of some varieties). Required head furnishings (5 points by ARBA standard) include a well formed mustache and an erect mane running down the head.

Abyssinians are deemed by many as good pets for experienced owners of exotic animals but their excitable nature makes them not necessarily a good choice for first time cavy owners.

Peruvian

The Peruvian has a long smooth coat all over its body, including a prominent "forelock" resulting from a portion of its coat on the head and the neck growing forward on the body. Their long hair is an autosomal recessive characteristic that is inherited. When two different length hair types are crossed, the shorter hair length will be the dominate one shown.

Silkie

A Silkie, also called a Sheltie, has long, smooth coat that flows back over the body. A Silkie must never have any rosettes or any hair growing in a direction towards its face. Its coat should not have a part. When viewed from above, a Silkie and its coat forms a teardrop shape. The coat is generally accepted to have a somewhat longer sweep of hair in the rear.

Coronet

The Coronet resembles the Silkie with its smooth coat growing backwards over its body, but it has a crest on its forehead. As with the short-coated crested breeds, this crest should be symmetrical and distinct with a small centre and no sticking hairs.

Lunkarya group

The Lunkarya, or "Lunk" for short, is a new group of related breeds developed in Sweden and mainly seen in the Nordic countries. These breeds have long, rough, curly coats that should be very dense and full. The group has three breed variations: the Lunkarya Peruvian (with a prominent forelock), the Lunkarya Sheltie (with hair flowing back over the body), and the Lunkarya Coronet (with a crest on the forehead).

It was initially described as a "dominant rex Peruvian", but later was named Lunkarya, a variation of the last name of the breed's creator: Lundqvist.

This breed is not recognized by the American Rabbit Breeders Association.

Texel

Texel guinea pigs were originally bred in Britain. They are characterized by their long, curly coat and fur that is coarser, not so curly, and shorter around their faces.

Merino

The Merino, or English Merino, is a texel with a crown (also known as a crest) on its head. It is recognized in Europe as a standard breed.

Sheba
The Sheba relate of the skinny, or "Sheba Mini Yak", is a long-haired, rosetted cavy characterized by "mutton chop" whiskers. It is often referred to as the "Bad-Hair-Day Cavy". The Sheba has a frontal presented to one side of the face in a naturally tousled appearance. They are recognized as a cavy breed in Australia. Their breed standard was developed by Wynne Eecen of Sydney, New South Wales, in the 1970s, and was published in her book Pigs Isn't Pigs.

This breed is not recognized by the American Rabbit Breeders Association.

Teddy

A Teddy has a short, rough, very dense, springy coat that stands up all over the body. The hair typically grows to a moderate length and makes this breed resemble a soft toy more than any other. Another unique feature of Teddies in the US is the relatively long hair coating their bellies. The Teddy has a kinky, springy coat that is famous for its soft, cuddly quality, often compared to an old teddy bear. They come in Plush Coat and Harsh Coat; the plush-coated animals have a softer coat, while the harsh-coated ones have a coarser texture to their hair.

Hairless varieties

Only two varieties of hairless guinea pig exist: the Skinny and the Baldwin. They are two separate breeds with different genetic factors rendering them hairless. Hairless cavies in general need warmer accommodation and more energy-rich food (foods to avoid) to compensate for the loss of body heat. They are also susceptible to draughts (breezes), drying of the skin, and skin infections without careful husbandry.

Skinny

The Skinny stands out for being a mostly hairless breed, with some short rough hair on the face and feet. Pups are born nearly hairless, unlike the Baldwin which loses its hair.

The breed was developed from a hairless laboratory strain that was crossed with Teddies and other haired breeds: a form of outcrossing.

Baldwin

The Baldwin, like the Skinny, is a nearly hairless breed. However, Baldwins are born with a full coat, which sheds out with age until only a little hair remains on the feet (the Skinny also has hair on the face).

The breed was developed from spontaneously mutated pups born to American Crested parents of a single breeder.

Colorations

Cavies of various breeds have several colorations and patterns. For short-coated cavies, most colors constitute breed variations bred and shown separately from other colors. All colorations should be true throughout the coat, with the roots and tips being of same shade.

In the case of broken-colored cavies, i.e. any cavies with other than separately recognised combinations of colors, the coloring is described in order of magnitude (i.e., a mostly lilac cavy with some cream and a speck of white would be called "lilac-cream-and-white", while a mostly white cavy with a patch of red-black ticking would be "white-and-golden-agouti").

Self
A self cavy is uniformly of one color, without any ticking or patterning. Self guinea pigs come in a variety of colors. The colors include black, chocolate, red, golden, buff, cream, white, lilac, beige, and slate.

Ticked

Ticked cavies have black series hairs with red series ticking, i.e. each individual hair has stripes of both a black and a red series color. In case a ticked cavy also has the tortoiseshell pattern, the red series patches are uniformly colored while the black series patch.

Agouti
An agouti cavy has a solid colored belly and is otherwise fully ticked. Two common variations are the golden agouti, with black and red, and the silver agouti, with black and white. Any other color combinations in the US are called dilute agouti.

A solid agouti is completely ticked. Its variations are referred to like normal agoutis, i.e. a solid agouti with black and red would be called a golden solid agouti, and so forth.

Brindle
A brindle cavy has intermixed hairs of both black and red series colors throughout their coats, with no ticking. An ideal show brindle appears uniformly colored, with both series appearing evenly all over.

Magpie
A magpie cavy is a particular form of brindle, with black for the black series, but substituting white for the red series. Magpie can easily be confused with "roan", although in magpie the white hairs can appear anywhere on the cavy.

Dutch pattern
A Dutch cavy has a specific white pattern: a blaze on the face, a wide white band around the neck, chest, and the belly, including the front paws, and white tips on the hind feet. The pattern is essentially the same as the Dutch pattern in rabbits, and was named after it.

Himalayan pattern
A Himalayan cavy has a white body with colored points (face, ears, feet). It is an acromelanic, i.e. temperature-responding coloration, and its degree of darkness depends on how cool or warm the cavy is kept in. Show Himalayans should have black or dark brown points with ruby, i.e. dark red, eyes. The darkest areas should be the face, paws, and the feet.

A Himalayan cavy is born solid white, the points slowly gaining color after a few weeks.

Tan pattern

A tan cavy is an otherwise solid black, with red ticking around the muzzle, around the eyes, in spots above the eyes, under the neck and the belly, and sparsely on the lower sides.

Otter and fox

Otter and fox cavies have yellow and white ticking, respectively. Different shades are named after the black series shade, for instance black otter, lilac-and-tan, and grey fox.

Tortoiseshell pattern
A tortoiseshell ("tortie" for short) cavy has patches of red and black. An ideal show tortoiseshell cavy has regular, well-defined patches of each color on each side, and appears to have lengthwise "seams" on its back and belly, almost similar to brindle. Diluted tortoiseshells are called broken colors, and diluted tortoiseshell-and-whites tricolors. They follow the same pattern ideal.

Roan and Dalmatian

A roan cavy has white hairs evenly intermixed on their body, while a Dalmatian (pattern) cavy has a white body with colored spots. The latter is named after the spotted Dalmatian dog, and is not actually from Dalmatia. The head and the rump are mostly colored in both varieties. They are caused by the same gene, and whether a cavy appears roan or Dalmatian is defined by modifier factors. Many cavies have an intermediate roan/Dalmatian pattern, and these varieties are challenging to successfully breed in show quality.

The roan/Dalmatian factor, sometimes called the "lethal white gene" or simply "lethal gene", is incompletely dominant. While the roan/Dalmatian factor is consistently visible in heterozygous carriers that do not have other factors producing white hair, the pattern can be masked by extreme dilution (resulting in full white coloration) or extreme white spotting. The gene is lethal when homozygous, resulting in full white pups with varying combinations of deafness, blindness, loss of smell, and deformities. Some lethal pups may survive for some time, while others die soon after birth if not euthanised. Most roan/Dalmatian breeders breed them solely to lethal-non-carriers to avoid the 25% risk of homozygous pups that occurs breeding carrier-to-carrier.

References

External links

 Home page for the Australian National Cavy Council Inc
 Cavy genetics
 List of breeds from the American Cavy Breeders Association
 Tips for a happy Cavy (GUIDE) - Guinea Pig Care

.
Lists of breeds
Guinea pig